Vasile Dobrău (born 14 June 1953) is a Romanian former football centre back. He was also a manager, assistant coach and youth coach.

International career
Vasile Dobrău played five games at international level for Romania, including qualification matches for the 1974 and 1978 World Cups.

Honours

Player
Dinamo București
Divizia A: 1972–73, 1974–75, 1976–77
Dacia Mecanica Orăștie
Divizia C: 1984–85

Notes

References

External links

Vasile Dobrău at Labtof.ro

1953 births
Living people
Romanian footballers
Romania international footballers
Association football defenders
Liga I players
Liga II players
FC Dinamo București players
FC Universitatea Cluj players
Romanian football managers
AFC Unirea Slobozia managers
Romanian expatriate football managers
Footballers from Bucharest